Vladimir Natalukha (born March 18, 1936) is a Soviet sprint canoer who competed in the early to mid-1960s. He won a silver medal in the K-1 4 × 500 m event at the 1963 ICF Canoe Sprint World Championships in Jajce.

Natalukha also competed at the 1960 Summer Olympics in Rome, finishing fifth in the K-1 4 × 500 m event.

References

Sports-reference.com profile

1936 births
Canoeists at the 1960 Summer Olympics
Living people
Olympic canoeists of the Soviet Union
Soviet male canoeists
Russian male canoeists
ICF Canoe Sprint World Championships medalists in kayak